Samguk yusa or Memorabilia of the Three Kingdoms is a collection of legends, folktales and historical accounts relating to the Three Kingdoms of Korea (Goguryeo, Baekje, and Silla), as well as to other periods and states before, during and after the Three Kingdoms period. "Samguk yusa is a historical record compiled by the Buddhist monk Il Yeon in 1281 (the 7th year of King Chungnyeol of Goryeo) in the late Goryeo Dynasty."  It is the earliest extant record of the Dangun legend, which records the founding of Gojoseon as the first Korean nation. The Samguk yusa is National Treasure No. 306.

Samguk yusa is a history book which is composed of five volumes in total and is divided into nine parts within the five volumes. The samguk yusa can be described to the documentation of tales and legends, which are categorised by the two parts such as extraordinary historical events and diverse Buddhist narratives. This book deals with various historical sources such as tales of the Three Kingdoms period, myths, legends, genealogies, histories, and Buddhist tales, and this helped maintain folklore from the medieval history of Korea. At the beginning of Samguk yusa, it is depicted that Dangun Wanggeom, who is a mythological ancestor of all Koreans, founded the first nation of Korea, named Gojoseon and this represents an intention to solidify a sense of national identity as a unified Korean people. The term "yusa" means historically, a supplementary work to an earlier work, so the title of the work explicitly demonstrates the intention of Il-yeon to provide additional information which was not explained in the previous ancient recordings like Samguk sagi which is one of the Korean history books. So, Samguk yusa is supplementarily used with Samguk sagi in Korean historical analysis. Samguk Yusa tried to increase the reliability by using various resources for one theme and by protecting original resources as much as possible, but there were errors in objectivity in terms of unbiased subjects that represent the overall community regardless of religion, region, and social hierarchy. There are many well-known tales in Samguk yusa including Choshin's Dream and Lady Suro.

Background 
'Samguk yusa', which is historically informative book of Korea's ancient culture, was written in the Ingak Temple in the 13th century. Since the author, Il-yeon, became a monk at the age of eight in 1214, he worked as an abbot in various temples, attended the royal conferences at the king's command, and hosted important Buddhist events until he died in 1289. The book was written during the Mongol conquest of Europe and East Asia, including China and Korea. They invaded Korea for the first time in 1231, and it brought a devastating blow to the lives of Koreans by destroying valuable cultural properties, recordings, and literature. The author Il-yeon lived in this era, and this invasion motivated him to protect all of the folklore and stories handed down. This purpose was able to be conducted since he collected materials and analyzed historical resources over a long period of time before the commencement of the Samguk yusa writing. Il-yeon, who died in the temple after the completion of Samguk yusa, was a kind of person who looked after the commoners who suffered under Mongolian rule during the end of Goryo's days, attempted to revitalise the spirit of national independence, and for the purpose of taking care of his aged mother, he decided to refuse to take the highest position in the kingdom's priest. Moreover, the Korean peninsula was not yet united when the Samguk yusa was composed, so, one of the samguk yusa myths, Dangun, which is regarded as the root of all Koreans, has long been believed to have contributed to the idea of "one blood, one nation" among Koreans, as well as helped themselves to be characterized as a "common blood race". However, there is also criticism that the sense of one blood could lead to not only marginalizing those who are not regarded as "genuinely Korean," but also restricting the different ways that people could consider themselves Korean by eliminating diverse and possible viewpoints that are not rooted in this conservative mythology.  In order to honor and pass down the monk Il-yeon's achievements and life, the Inagak temple holds annual festivals like the Cultural Festival of Ilyeon Samguk Yusa under the assistance of the Ministry of Culture and Tourism, and the festival activities include an academic seminar for academics, a writing contest for poems or essays, and poem recitation.

Contents 

The History of the Three Kingdoms consists of a total of five volumes and two books, and apart from the volume, it consists of nine books, including Wangryeok, Gii, Heungbeop, Tapsang, Uihae, Sinju, Gamtong, Pieun, and Hyo-seon. Wangnyeok is a brief chronology of the Three Kingdoms, Garakguk, Later Goguryeo, and Later Baekje. Gii contains the archive from Gojoseon to the late Three Kingdoms Period. The purpose of Gii is written at the beginning of the passage. Heungbeop is about the rise of Buddhism in the Three Kingdoms, and Tapsang includes pagodas and Buddhist images. Uihae contains narratives of famous monks during the Silla period. Sinju includes the tales about miracles that happened through esoteric Buddhism during the Silla dynasty. Gamtong is about stories of devotion. Pieun contains the legends of solitary heroes. Hyoseon contains folktales of filial piety and Buddhist virtues. Although it is divided into many parts, the composition of the entire book can be briefly described below:

Authorship and dating
The text was written in Classical Chinese, which was used by literate Koreans at the time of its composition. The earliest version of the text is believed to have been compiled in the 1280s, and the earliest extant publication of the text is from 1512 CE.

20th-century Korean scholars such as Choe Nam-seon established the Buddhist monk Iryeon (1206–1289) as the main compiler of the text, on the basis that his name (and full official title) was indicated in the fifth fascicle. This view is widely accepted among modern scholars. The compilation is believed to have been expanded by Iryeon's disciple Muguk (1250-1322) and several others prior to the definitive 1512 recension.

Ha Chongnyong and Yi Kunjik produced a critical edition of Samguk yusa in 1997. According to Ha Chongnyong, Iryeon wrote only the fifth fascicle, since his name is mentioned only in that section of the text.

The 1512 edition of the text mentions a dynastic chronology at the beginning, which has several discrepancies with the information that appears later in the text. According to Robert Buswell, Jr. and Donald S. Lopez, Jr., this chronology may have been a fourteenth-century addition to Iryeon's compilation.

National Heritage 

Importance as the national treasure

“Samguk yusa is considered as an extremely important cultural heritage representing ancient Korean history, geography, literature, religion, language, folklore, art, archeology, etc.” The Samguk Yusa mostly includes ancient literary works about history, Buddhism, and legends, most of which does not exist in the recent age. Moreover, it is one of the limited sources for the study of ancient Korean language systems. Especially, 14 pieces of hyangga (ancient Korean folk songs) are an essential part of a study in classical Korean literature. Moreover, the writer, Iryon uses different styles of writing including ones from the Sinitic Buddhist Culture. The book also includes plenty of information on Buddhist art, the dominant type of art in ancient Korean art history. “The Tapsang section, in particular, mainly focuses on the founding of pagodas, Buddhist images and temples, is an essential source for the study of various remains and relics of both historical and archeological value. Lastly, the book includes various written records about young soldiers during the Silla Dynasty.

Comparison with Samguk sagi 
Samguk sagi and Samguk yusa are often compared in terms of Korean history books, and actually, both of them have significant identities in Korean history. In terms of similarity, both of them were written by Koryo scholars who believed they were descended from not Koguryo but Silla. So, this contributed to the main focus of both Samguk yusa and Samguk sagi to emphasize the history of Silla. However, in contrast, they have some differences. Firstly, while the author of Samguk yusa was a devoted Buddhist monk, Samguk sagi was written by a Confucian scholar-statesman, Kim Pu-shik, so,  readers are able to access the two different historical works according to the perspectives of Buddhist or Confucian official.

According to the Cultural Heritage Administration of Korea, "the book contains a wide range of records about young soldiers of the Silla Period, which are more religious and poetical than those written in Samguk sagi." On the other hand, studies have found that “Samguk Sagi was almost immediately accepted as one of the most definitive histories of its time and within several decades was read even in China." Therefore, it can be considered that even though the Samguk yusa was written a century later, Iryon considerably relied on the Samguk sagi. Moreover, the Samguk yusa contains the historical elements not found in the Samguk sagi. Since it is also the same in reserve, it is found that the two works complement each other.

Kim Pu-shik attempted a more rational and logical approach towards the historical writings, whereas the romantic Buddhism approach of Samguk yusa of the Koryo dynasty allowed the readers to experience the old historical cultures such as superstitions, folklore, and mythical stories. Both of the historical books are also generally focused on certain backgrounds in terms of religion. Despite Samguk sagi's reasonable writing, nationalist historians and scholars refer to it as a Chinese Confucian-centered book, arguing that it instils a subordinate attitude(Sadae) with the ancient tradition ignored. In contrast, in the case of Samguk yusa, the majority of the text is dedicated to Buddhism, which was tailored to the Korean style under the Buddhist author's influence with the only occasion when Confucianism is witnessed is Part 9 which expresses filial piety as a way of Buddhism. Naturally, the contents of Samguk yusa could not help being influenced more greatly by Il-yeon’s Buddhist value than Samguk sagi. Il-yeon's work provides four bizarre stories depicting the discovery of archaeological artifacts to demonstrate the existence of Buddhism in the pre-modern era, the time of the tale's telling. Turning to the statistics, the writings of Samguk Yusa consist of Buddhist stories, including both the principles of Buddhism and various Buddhist monks, accounting for approximately forty-nine percent (49.5%) of the total. In terms of adequate factual delivery, Samguk Yusa conveys relatively insufficient historical information, such as about the explanation of Kwallogup (officials' land) and Sigup (the land for producing food), which are well described in Samguk sagi in detail. Nonetheless, the samguk yusa and samguk sagi are mutually regarded as complementary regarding uncompleted ancient recordings among Koreans today.

Historical reliability
Many of the founding legends of the various kingdoms in Korean history are recorded in Samguk yusa. The text covers legends from many Korean kingdoms, including Gojoseon, Wiman Joseon, Buyeo, Goguryeo, Baekje, Silla, and Gaya. Unlike the more factually-oriented Samguk sagi, the Samguk yusa focuses on various folktales, legends and biographies from early Korean history. Given its mythical narratives, Samguk yusas reliability is questionable.

The author attempted to keep original phrases drawn from various sources, including Chinese Buddhist literature, Korean historical literature, and languages written in epigraphy, and he sometimes omitted unnecessary phrases or paraphrased several expressions with the intention of integrating them into the whole story. In terms of Il-yeon’s research approach, Il-yeon regarded the quality and quantity of the resources as crucial elements for his work, used the "inserted textual commentary" in order to seriously evaluate his resources, allowed the readers to access comparative information about the history, and even expressed concerns about the reliability when there was insufficient information to depict. Besides, Il-yeon attempted to use various versions of the same story when he recorded folktales and myths. For instance, when Il-yeon recorded the story of Tangun at the beginning of the book, he exactly added the comments that the Tangun story was quoted from both the Wei-shu [Wei Dyansty History] and Tangun Kogi [Ancient Record of Tangun]. This comment is valuable as both of the history books are not accessible now. The inscription of Samguk Yusa is also a relatively credible source, but its contents are mainly confined to the mobilization of the peasantry for dike construction and the description of land property for the temple. There is scepticism surrounding this history book as well. It was not able to precisely interpret and explain the detailed picture of Silla itself as this book was written in the Koryo period, during which a lot of time had passed from the three kingdoms period. The stories of the other nations of the three-kingdom period "Koguryo" and Paekche" are excluded, making up the overwhelming bulk of the Silla stories, especially the stories that came from Korea's south-eastern region, "Kyngsang," known as Il-yeon's place of birth. With regard to religion, Confucianism, which greatly influenced the behaviour of East Asians, including China and Korea, was marginally dealt with in the Buddhism-dominant Samguk yusa tales as a subjugated religion. For example, in the Tale of the Monk Chinjong, Chinjong's filial reasons for not wanting to enter the monastic life are countered by his mother, and this reflects that the monastic life would be regarded as even more filial behaviour than ignoring the filial piety. Furthermore, the book is quite biased in terms of providing an unbiased description of the social stratum. The aristocracy and members of the upper class constitute over half of the total number of narrative protagonists, with the figures correlated with Buddhist monks or nuns making up approximately twenty-five percent, and commoners only making up around eight percent of the contexts.   It can be clarified that the Samguk yusa chiefly handled the stories of the upper class of Silla instead of the ordinary people. Although the readers who have the purpose of understanding the entire history have to merely rely on the resources that he chose to insert in the Samguk yusa, it is recommended as a worthwhile read for the purpose of comprehending the overall landscape of Silla.

Influences on Korean Buddhism tradition 
The three Kingdom periods in Samguk yusa is the age of the start of various institutions, teachings, religious practices, and cults. The tales are both descriptive and prescriptive because they have been the source of the Korean Buddhist tradition to the present day as the birth of the tradition is described in the book. The places which are mentioned in the book are important religious points in current South Korea also. “The naming of mountains in Samguk Yusa connects Korea with China and India and symbolically recreates the actual sacred places of Buddhism in Korea.” Most of the stories in Samguk yusa included a common topos, when temples and statues’ remains are found and disclosed on key locations such as mountains. This can be described as a form of hierophany and the religious key places of Silla included those locations. Moreover, Iryon introduces Republic of Korea as a country with the best karmic attributes in the whole universe for building a huge statue of the Buddha, even more fitting than India, which is the home of Buddhism. The story in Samguk Yusa enlists ten thousand of Buddhas and bodhisattvas changing themselves at the apex of the different mountains. Moreover, this story introduces Korea as a country with the best karmic conditions in the world for building a large statue of the Buddha, even more suitable than India, the home of Buddhism. The mountains were later changed into one large religious area including of multiple temples and shrines. Each of the locations was devoted to certain buddhas and bodhisattvas and were used for the ritual practices to be performed.

Legends and Tales 
The text of the book covers a wide range of subjects, including geography, literature, religion, art, and folklore, as well as ancient history. The stories naturally came from the Goryeo people's lives under the extreme suffering in the Mongol-dominant era in order to strengthen both their identity as a nation and as descendants of a common ancestor. Among them, there are representative stories.

Lady Suro 
When Soon Jeong-gong had lunch at Imhaejeong Pavilion while taking office as Gangneung Taesu during King Seongdeok's reign, Soon Jeong's wife, lady Suro saw that the royal azalea flowers were in full bloom asked people around her to pick those flowers and an old man who was walking along the street with a cow listened to his wife, picked the flower to her. After this, a dragon suddenly appeared from the sea, dragged Soon Jeong's wife, Lady Suro, into the sea and an old man appeared suddenly and said, "If you gather the people and sing a song and hit the river hill with a cane, you will be able to meet your wife." Her husband did as the old man said and the dragon really brought his wife out and sent her in front of them. This story portrays Lady Suro's unparalleled beauty that the water souls cannot ignore.

Choshin's Dream 
A monk who adores Kim Nang-Ja enthusiastically begged Gwaneum Bodhisattva to realise love with her. However, one day, he heard that she had married. Choshin fell asleep resenting the Avalokitesvara Bodhisattva, but when Kim Nang-ja came at night and asked to have a relationship, he went to his hometown together with joy and lived for more than 40 years. In the meantime, he had five children, but he was poor and wandered around. His 15-year-old child starved to death while passing through Haehyeonryeong Pass in Myeongju, but he failed to hold a funeral. When Kim Nang-ja says, "Let's break up with each other rather than continue the miserable life as it is," Choshin agrees and awakes from his dream while trying to leave the road after sharing the children with each other. After experiencing a miserable life of poverty and bareness in a dream, he realizes how vain human life is.

Different Publications of Samguk yusa 

Kyujanggak Collection

It is owned by Kyujanggak Institute for Korean Studies. This book is known as the earliest edition of Samguk Yusa. Also, it is the only book without missing pages and is complete out of all the Samguk yusa books published in Gyeongju in 1512 (the 7th year of King Jungjong). This edition is most used by academic scholars in research.

Quantity: 5 Volumes of 2 Books

Address: Seoul National University Kyujanggak Institute for Korean Studies, #103, 1, Gwanak-ro, Gwanak-gu, Seoul

Beomeosa Temple Collection

The copy (one book composed of volumes 4 and 5), designated as National Treasure No. 306-4, is kept at Beomeosa Temple in Busan in the form of one book not including volumes 1 to 3. Additional two woodblock-printed editions of The Memorabilia have been excavated in addition to this copy, and they have been designated as National Treasure Nos. 306 and 306-3. Even though this edition is an incomplete set, researchers regard it as a highly valuable bibliography. As it is the first printed copy of the Samguk yusa that have been engraved on wood in 1934. This edition is considered meaningful from both the historical and academic perspectives as it is a crucial copy for the restoration of the original woodblock-printed copy of the Samguk yusa, given that it is the only source with which Chapters 28, 29, and 30, which are missing from the other copies, can be included, along with the missing letters and errors in the copy published in 1512 (the 7th year of King Jungjong’s reign). Additionally, the collection at Beomeosa Temple is found to be closely related to the one published in 1512 in terms of its font, size, and spacing between the lines, which shows its importance for bibliographical research was recognized even during the Joseon Dynasty. Moreover, as it contains information on how to read the Chinese characters used in the text in Hangul (Korean alphabet), it is an applicable material for researchers of Korea’s ancient language.
It has been designated as the national treasure of the Republic of Korea on August 27, 2020

Quantity: 2 Volumes in 1 Book

Address: Geumjeong-gu, Busan

Korea University Collection

This book contains volumes 3-5 of Samguk yusa (Memorabilia of the Three Kingdoms). The first 10 pages of volume 3, and pages 18 to 31 of volume 5 (total of 23 pages) are missing. The cover of this book was restored, and the five-hole woven with a red thread was used for the title page. This book was kept by Choe Nam-seon, and was later donated to Korea University in Seoul. This book originated from the edition published in Gyeongju in 1512 (the 7th year of the reign of King Jungjong of the Joseon Dynasty), which is the most commonly used version in the latest academic fields. “The book belongs to the copy withdrawn relatively early among other extant copies of the Jeongdeok Edition of Samguk yusa, and has value as the bibliography of the Jeongdeok Edition (also known as the Imshin Edition of King Jungjong).” It is the only copy of the Jeongdeok Edition to include Korean endings on the Chinese characters.

Quantity: 3 Volumes in 1 Book

Address: Korea University Library 145, Anam-ro, Seongbuk-gu, Seoul

Jung-gu Collection

The version of Samguk Yusa (Memorabilia of the Three Kingdoms) is the only copy with Volume 2 and no other volumes. In this copy, 4 sheets (17-20) out of 49 pages of the text were restored. Also, the cover is restored in a Manja pattern with a five-needle red thread, and the binding is in good condition.

On the front cover, "Hwangmajungyangwolmaedeuk Nisannamssigajang" is written with ink in the center.  Moreover, the word, "Nisanjang" on the middle of back cover, indicates that it was purchased and kept by a person with surname Nam in February of the 55th year of the Chinese Sexagenary Cycle. In terms of structure, 24 out of 49 pages are generally longer than 1 cm in length compared to Jeongdeokbon edition. In terms of content, it can be seen that it was published in the early Joseon Dynasty, as they were written in the style to avoid the names of Goryeo Dynasty's kings. Moreover, it includes many differences compared to the Jeongdeok edition, which was published in Gyeongju in 1512 (the 7th year of the reign of King Jungjong), and acts as a reference to compare and correct the mistakes in the Jeongdeok edition.

Quantity: 1 book (1 volume)

Address: Jung-gu, Seoul

Seodaemun-gu Collection

This copy of Samguk Yusa, designated as National Treasure of Korea (No. 306-3) is an early Joseon edition. Along with Royal calendar, the brief chronology of Silla, Goguryeo, Baekje, Gaya, and Unified Silla, Later goguryeo (including Goryeo), and Later Baekjae, it contains the records of mythical events (historical and cultural facts from the Gojoseon to the Late Three Kingdoms period). Even though, part 3 and 5 remain out of a total of five books, this copy is valuable in that it is a complete edition without any missing pages as an early Joseon book. In addition, it has an important value in that it can supplement letters that are difficult to read among the Samguk Yusa published in 1512 (7th year of King Jungjong's reign) and identify cited literary works of which there are no extant copies.

Quantity: 2 Volumes in 1 Book

Address: Seodaemun-gu, Seoul

Jongno-gu Collection

This book is a collection of three volumes, 3rd to 5th volumes of the Book of the Three Kingdoms. The title "Samguk Yusa" is written in large letters and in small letters, it is written as "Seokju" in the blue silk cover of the book. Every damaged and missing part of the copy was repaired and fully recovered to match the original contents. The volume consists of total 107 pages, 50 pages of the third chapter (missing first 6 pages), 31 pages of the fourth chapter, and 26 pages of the fifth chapter (missing last 4 pages). On the other hand, it is possible that most of the early Joseon books were not applied to the subjects of the Goryeo kings' names, such as Yong (the father of King Taejo) and Mu (the name of Hyejong) who were replaced by other characters in honor and samga. In terms of content, there are many differences in text from various books of Jeongdeokbon. This book is the earliest manuscript ever published in the late 14th century (the early Joseon Dynasty) before the 7th year of King Jungjong (1512) of Joseon Dynasty. Moreover, it is a valuable resource to correct errors in the edition in early Joseon period and it also works as a bibliography.

Quantity: 3 Volumes in 1 Book

Address: Jongno-gu, Seoul

Editions
 Ilyeon (2006) Overlooked Historical Records of the Three Korean Kingdoms, translated by Kim Dal-Yong. Jimoondang: Seoul, Korea. 
 Ilyon (1972; 2006) Samguk Yusa: Legends and History of the Three Kingdoms of Ancient Korea, translated by Tae-Hung Ha and Grafton K. Mintz. Yonsei University Press: Seoul, Korea. 
 일연 (1996) 삼국유사. Somun munhwasa: Seoul. .
 일연 (2002) 삼국유사. translated by Kim Won-jung. Eulyu munhwasa: Seoul. .

See also
History of Korea
Three Kingdoms of Korea

References

External links
 The official website showing the original text as well as the translation in Korean Hangul (National Institute of Korean History)
 Original Text of the Samguk yusa.
Samguk Yusa - World History Encyclopedia
三國遺事 (Links to full text of Samguk yusa in literary Chinese)

13th-century history books
History books about Korea
History of Korea
Goryeo works